Blasingame  may refer to:
 Alison Blasingame (born 1990), an all-SoCon volleyball player
 Don Blasingame (1932-2005), a baseball player
 Jim Blasingame, a small business advocate
 Khari Blasingame (born 1996), American football player
 Marguerite Louis Blasingame (1906-1947), an American sculptor
 Paul B. Blasingame, recipient of NASA Distinguished Public Service Medal
 Wade Blasingame (born 1943), a baseball player

 The name is also spelled "Blasingame". Somewhere down the line, some branches of the family dropped one "S" from the spelling.